The RS200 is a 4m, double handed, hiking, racing dinghy. Designed in 1995 by Phil Morrison and manufactured by RS Sailing.  It has a lightweight polyester GRP with Coremat hull construction.

Performance and design
The RS200 utilises a single line asymmetrical spinnaker system and low sheet loads on the sail controls. It can be sailed by weights of between 16 and 26 stone. The open transom allows the RS200 to virtually self drain after a capsize and a moulded self bailer removes any remaining water.

References

External links
 
 RS Sailing (Global HQ)
 ISAF Connect to Sailing
 International RS Classes Association
 UK RS200 Class Association
 UK RS Association
 German RS Class Association

Dinghies
1990s sailboat type designs
Boats designed by Phil Morrison
Sailboat types built by RS Sailing